Donald of Scotland can refer to:
 Domnall mac Ailpín (Donald I of Scotland)
 Donald II of Scotland
 Donald III of Scotland